John Knapton (fl. 1406–1433), of Cambridge, was an English politician.

He was a Member (MP) of the Parliament of England for Cambridge in 1406, 1415, 1419 and 1431. Knapton was mayor of Cambridge from 1432 to 1433.

References

14th-century births
15th-century deaths
English MPs 1406
English MPs 1415
Mayors of Cambridge
English MPs 1419
English MPs 1431